CJMI-FM, branded as 105.7 myFM, is an FM radio station located in Strathroy, Ontario, Canada. Owned by My Broadcasting Corporation, the station airs an adult contemporary format.

External links
105.7 myFM
 
 

Jmi
Jmi
Strathroy-Caradoc
Radio stations established in 2007
2007 establishments in Ontario
JMI